Amidou Diop (born 25 February 1992) is a Senegalese footballer who plays as a midfielder for Norwegian club Aalesund. In Senegal he is called Hamidou or Mido.

Career

Club
Diop had previously been on trial at Lyon and Nancy, before signing for Molde summer 2014, and making his debut on November 2, 2014 against Strømsgodset.

In the spring of 2015 Diop was loaned from Molde FK to Mjøndalen IF.

On 1 August 2017, Diop moved permanently to Kristiansund BK.

Career statistics

References

External links

1992 births
Living people
Senegalese footballers
Molde FK players
Mjøndalen IF players
Kristiansund BK players
Adanaspor footballers
Eliteserien players
Norwegian First Division players
TFF First League players
Senegalese expatriate footballers
Expatriate footballers in Norway
Expatriate footballers in Turkey
Senegalese expatriate sportspeople in Norway
Senegalese expatriate sportspeople in Turkey
Association football midfielders
Senegal youth international footballers